This page details statistics of the EuroCup Basketball. Unless notified these statistics concern all seasons since inception of the ULEB Cup in the 2002–03 season, including qualifying rounds of the EuroCup as per "Competition facts"; all matches before regular season count as "qualifying matches".

General performances

By club

By country

All-time top-25 EuroCup Basketball ranking

Semi-final appearances

By club

Participating clubs in the EuroCup
The following is a list of clubs that have played or will be playing in the EuroCup group stages.

Italic: club was transferred from the EuroLeague.

References

External links
Official website

Statistics
Basketball statistics